The Daytrippers is a 1996 independent comedy-drama film written and directed by Greg Mottola in his feature directorial debut. It stars Hope Davis, Stanley Tucci, Anne Meara, Parker Posey and Liev Schreiber.

Plot
Eliza (Hope Davis) discovers a love letter that may prove that her husband Louis (Stanley Tucci) is having an affair, so she decides to go to New York City and confront him. Her family, including her parents Jim (Pat McNamara) and Rita (Anne Meara), her sister Jo (Parker Posey), and Jo's live-in boyfriend Carl (Liev Schreiber), go along for the ride in the family station wagon from Long Island.

Cast
 Stanley Tucci as Louis D'Amico
 Hope Davis as Eliza Malone D'Amico
 Pat McNamara as Jim Malone
 Anne Meara as Rita Malone
 Parker Posey as Jo Malone
 Liev Schreiber as Carl Petrovic
 Campbell Scott as Eddie Masler
 Marcia Gay Harden as Libby
 Douglas McGrath as "Chap"
 Peter Askin as Nick Woodman
 Paul Herman as Leon

Release 
The Daytrippers premiered at the Slamdance Film Festival in January, 1996 where it won the festival’s first Grand Jury Prize. The film was released on March 5, 1997. The film opened to 52 theaters and grossed $35,988 in its opening weekend. Overall, the film grossed $2,099,677 domestically.

Reception 
On Rotten Tomatoes the film has an approval rating of 73% based on reviews from 26 critics. On Metacritic it has a score of 73% based on reviews from 18 critics.

Owen Gleiberman of Entertainment Weekly gave it a grade B and compared to the film to David O. Russell's Flirting With Disaster but praised director Mottola as having "a lighter, warmer touch" and that he "keeps the action flowing and gets lively work" from the cast.

Awards

References

External links

 
  
 The Daytrippers: Alone, Together an essay by Emily Nussbaum at the Criterion Collection

1996 films
1996 comedy-drama films

American comedy-drama films
American independent films
Canadian comedy-drama films
Canadian independent films
English-language Canadian films
1990s English-language films
Films about dysfunctional families
Films directed by Greg Mottola
Films produced by Steven Soderbergh
Films set in Long Island
Films set in New York City
Films shot in New York (state)
Films shot in New York City
1996 directorial debut films
1996 independent films
1990s American films
1990s Canadian films